

Eugen-Heinrich Bleyer (20 November 1896 – 18 March 1979) was a German general during World War II and a recipient of the Knight's Cross of the Iron Cross. Bleyer surrendered to the Yugoslavian troops in May 1945. In 1949 he was sentenced to death, but his sentence was changed to 18 years imprisonment and he was released in 1952.

Awards and decorations

 Knight's Cross of the Iron Cross on 14 December 1941 as Oberstleutnant and commander of Infanterie-Regiment 379
 Merit Cross 1st Class of the Federal Republic of Germany (17 August 1967)

References

Citations

Bibliography

 

1896 births
1979 deaths
Military personnel from Mainz
Lieutenant generals of the German Army (Wehrmacht)
German Army personnel of World War I
Recipients of the clasp to the Iron Cross, 1st class
Recipients of the Order of the Cross of Liberty, 2nd Class
Recipients of the Knight's Cross of the Iron Cross
Officers Crosses of the Order of Merit of the Federal Republic of Germany
People from Rhenish Hesse
20th-century Freikorps personnel